Nuotio is a surname. Notable people with the surname include:

Eppu Nuotio (born 1962), Finnish actress and author
Paavo Nuotio (1901–1968), Finnish ski jumper